Safwan M. Masri is a Jordanian professor, senior academic administrator, global educator, and scholar of education in the Arab World. He is the current Dean of Georgetown University School of Foreign Service in Qatar. Previously, he served as Executive Vice President for Global Centers and Global Development at Columbia University and was head of Columbia Global Centers (2011-2022) as well as director of Columbia Global Center in Amman since its founding in 2009.

As a scholar on education and contemporary geopolitics and society in the Arab world, Masri's work focuses on understanding the historic, postcolonial dynamics among religion, education, society, and politics. He is the author of Tunisia: An Arab Anomaly (Columbia University Press, 2017), which examines why Tunisia was the only country to emerge from the Arab Spring as a democracy. Masri's writings on education and current affairs have been featured in the Financial Times, Huffington Post, The Hill, The Brown Journal of World Affairs, and Times Higher Education.

Life and career 
Masri joined Columbia University in 1988 as a professor of operations management at Columbia Business School, where he served as vice dean from 1993-2006. Previously, he was a visiting professor at INSEAD, and taught at Stanford University and Santa Clara University.

At the request of King Abdullah II of Jordan, Masri led the effort to establish King's Academy in Jordan, the first coeducational boarding school in the Middle East, and was founding chairman of its board of trustees. An advisor to Queen Rania Al Abdullah of Jordan, Masri was founding chairman of the Queen Rania Teacher Academy.

Masri currently holds a senior research scholar appointment at Columbia's School of International and Public Affairs (SIPA).

Masri is a lifetime member of the Council on Foreign Relations, an honorary fellow of the Foreign Policy Association, and a member of the International Advisory Council of the World Congress for Middle Eastern Studies (WOCMES). He serves on the Board of Directors for AMIDEAST and on the Global Advisory Board for the Chazen Institute at Columbia Business School. Masri is also a trustee of International College in Beirut and the Welfare Association (Taawon) in Ramallah, and a director of Endeavor Jordan.

Columbia Global Centers 
In 2009, Columbia University president Lee C. Bollinger created the Columbia Global Centers, a network of regional hubs of programming and research. These centers work to advance Columbia's global mission as well as extend the University's reach to address the pressing demands of our global society and are located in: Amman, Jordan; Beijing, China; Istanbul, Turkey; Mumbai, India; Nairobi, Kenya; Paris, France; Rio de Janeiro, Brazil; and Santiago, Chile. Tunis, Tunisia;

Education 
Masri earned his B.S. in 1982 and his M.S. in 1984 in Industrial Engineering from Purdue University. In 1988, he was awarded a Ph.D. in Industrial Engineering and Engineering Management from Stanford University.

Awards and Recognitions 
Masri was awarded the 2003 American Service Award from the American-Arab Anti-Discrimination Committee; and the Robert W. Lear Service Award, the Dean's Award for Teaching Excellence in a Core Course, and the Singhvi Professor of the Year for Scholarship in the Classroom Award, all from Columbia University.

References

External links 
 Columbia Global Centers
 World Economic Forum: Safwan M. Masri bio

Living people
Columbia University faculty
Purdue University College of Health and Human Sciences alumni
Stanford University alumni
Year of birth missing (living people)
Deans of Georgetown University in Qatar